Progress Energy, headquartered in Raleigh, North Carolina, is a subsidiary of Duke Energy and prior to its merger with Duke Energy was a Fortune 500 energy company with more than 21,000 megawatts of generation capacity and $9 billion in annual revenues. Progress Energy includes two major electric utilities that serve approximately 3.1 million customers in the Carolinas and Florida. As an independent company, the last chairman and CEO of Progress Energy was William D. Johnson; his predecessor was Robert McGehee, who died on October 9, 2007 at the age of 64 of a stroke while on a business trip to London.

Progress Energy is the majority owner and operator of the Brunswick, Crystal River 3, Robinson, and Shearon Harris nuclear power plants.

On October 16, 1999, third quarter earnings of Florida Progress Corp. fell 20.5 percent as damage from Hurricane Floyd.

On August 24, 1999, Carolina Power & Light Co. said that it would acquire Florida Progress Corp. for $5.3 billion, creating the nation's ninth-largest electric utility.

The company's current slogan is, "People, performance, excellence."

History

In 2000, Carolina Power & Light bought Florida Power Corporation and changed its name to Progress Energy. Progress Energy represents a family of companies, including CP&L, Florida Power, Progress Telecom, NCNG and SRS, and an important new organization, Energy Ventures. The company built a new headquarters in downtown Raleigh in 2004.

On January 10, 2011, Duke Energy announced plans to take over Progress Energy in a $26 billion deal resulting in the country's largest electric utility with 7.1 million customers. Duke Energy plans to "maintain substantial operations in Raleigh." When the merger was completed on July 3, 2012, Duke Chairman James E. (Jim) Rogers became Chairman and CEO of the new combined company, while Progress CEO Bill Johnson resigned.

Environmental record
In 2008, the Corporate Responsibility Officer named Progress Energy to its list of 100 Best Corporate Citizens. Progress Energy was named to the Dow Jones Sustainability Index in 2009, 2008, 2007, 2006 and 2005.

The company is investing $300,000 in a UNC Chapel Hill study to map the offshore wind power potential of North Carolina. Progress Energy launched its SunSense-branded solar incentive programs in 2009.

Progress Energy has installed flue-gas desulfurization technology, or scrubbers, to remove sulfur dioxide emissions from its nine largest coal-fired power plant units.

Researchers at the University of Massachusetts Amherst have identified Progress Energy as the 29th-largest corporate producer of Air pollution in the United States in 2002, when it released roughly 39 million pounds of toxic chemicals into the air. Major pollutants included nickel compounds, chromium compounds, sulfuric acid, and hydrochloric acid. Progress has also been named a potentially responsible party at the Carolina Transformer Co. Superfund toxic waste site, according to the Center for Public Integrity.

Naming rights
Progress Energy owns the naming rights to the University of Central Florida's Progress Energy Welcome Center, St. Petersburg's Progress Energy Park, home of Al Lang Field, Progress Energy Center for the Arts-Mahaffey Theater, and the "Progress Energy Center for the Performing Arts" in downtown Raleigh, NC.

See also
List of power stations in Florida

References

External links
Progress Energy Inc website

Electric power companies of the United States
Natural gas companies of the United States
Nuclear power companies of the United States
Energy in North Carolina
Companies based in Raleigh, North Carolina
Energy companies established in 2000
Non-renewable resource companies established in 2000
2000 establishments in North Carolina
Companies formerly listed on the New York Stock Exchange
2012 mergers and acquisitions